Dunkirk is an unincorporated town in Eel Township, Cass County, Indiana.

Geography

References

External links

Unincorporated communities in Cass County, Indiana
Unincorporated communities in Indiana